Tanner is an unincorporated community in central southern Limestone County, Alabama, United States, and is included in the Huntsville-Decatur Combined Statistical Area. It lies nine miles north of the city of Decatur and the Tennessee River, and four miles south of the city of Athens.

Education
Tanner is home to Tanner High School (The Rattlers), a 2A school in the state's classification system. The school's boys' and girls' basketball teams both won state titles in 1986 and 2011 and is the only school in Alabama to do so.

History
Tanner was settled along the Louisville and Nashville Railroad in the 19th century and was originally named McDonald's Station, then Rowland. A Rowland post office was established in 1878. In 1913, the Tanner post office was established, named after Samuel Tanner who was the first mayor of nearby Athens.

Tornado history
On April 3, 1974, the area was struck by the 1974 Super Outbreak; two violent stovepipe tornadoes that were both one-third of a mile in width hit the community within 30 minutes during the early nighttime hours. Both tornadoes were rated F5 on the Fujita Scale. After the first tornado passed through the area, a second tornado surprised the rescue effort. In total, 50 were killed by those tornadoes.

On April 27, 2011, during what some meteorologists call the 2011 Super Outbreak, Tanner and other surrounding communities were hit by a large EF5 tornado. It was third F5 or EF5 tornado to strike Tanner and the surrounding communities in Limestone County.

Climate
The climate in this area is characterized by hot, humid summers and generally mild to cool winters.  According to the Köppen Climate Classification system, Tanner has a humid subtropical climate, abbreviated "Cfa" on climate maps.

Notable people
 Reshard Langford, professional football safety
 Gary Redus, Former MLB player (Cincinnati Reds, Philadelphia Phillies, Chicago White Sox, Pittsburgh Pirates, Texas Rangers)
 Rocky Roberts, singer

References

Unincorporated communities in Alabama
Unincorporated communities in Limestone County, Alabama
Huntsville-Decatur, AL Combined Statistical Area